Katie Shanahan (born 25 June 2004) is a British swimmer. She competed in the women's 400 metre individual medley event at the 2021 FINA World Swimming Championships (25 m) in Abu Dhabi.

At the 2022 Commonwealth Games, held in Birmingham, England starting in July, Shanahan won the bronze medal in the 400 metre individual medley with a time of 4:39.37. Three days later, she won the bronze medal in the 200 metre backstroke with a personal best time of 2:09.22.

References

External links
 

2004 births
Living people
British female freestyle swimmers
Place of birth missing (living people)
21st-century British women
Swimmers at the 2022 Commonwealth Games
Commonwealth Games bronze medallists for Scotland
Commonwealth Games medallists in swimming
European Aquatics Championships medalists in swimming
Medallists at the 2022 Commonwealth Games
Scottish female swimmers